Lismore Heights is a locality in the Northern Rivers region of New South Wales, Australia.

Notes

Towns in New South Wales
Northern Rivers
City of Lismore